Yo-kai Watch Dance: Just Dance Special Version is a 2015 dance video game developed by Ubisoft Paris, Ubisoft Milan, Ubisoft Reflections, Ubisoft Bucharest, Ubisoft Pune, Ubisoft Montpellier, and Ubisoft Barcelona and co-developed and published by Level-5 for the Wii U. The game is a collaboration between Level-5's Yo-kai Watch series and Ubisoft's Just Dance series, therefore being the fourth Japanese installment of the Just Dance series, and sees the players attempting to mimic dances performed by Yo-kai Watch characters in the game. The songs and dances featured in the game are originally from the Yo-kai Watch anime series.

Gameplay 
Like previous Just Dance installments, Yo-kai Watch Dance: Just Dance Special Version sees the players attempting to mimic dances performed by characters on-screen, which is then read by the Wii Remote's motion detection feature. Players can also unlock avatars, named Yo-kai Badges, by using a coin on the Crank-a-kai, a gashapon-like mechanic.

Development and release 
Yo-kai Watch Dance: Just Dance Special Version was primarily developed by Level-5, and was their first Wii U game. Ubisoft also assisted in development. It was based on Just Dance 2014, as in the previous Japanese installment in the Just Dance series, Just Dance Wii U. All of the online features, including the "World Dance Floor", were removed, just like in the previous game.

Yo-kai Watch Dance: Just Dance Special Version was first announced in the August 2015 issue of  CoroCoro Comics, and was later corroborated by Nintendo on their official news website. The announcement showcased some of the game's dances and music. Two trailers for the game were later uploaded to YouTube by Level-5 in November later the same year. On the 39th page of the December 2015 issue of CoroCoro Comics, a QR code was featured which, when scanned in the game, would give the player in-game currency as well as a rare Yo-kai Badge. A playable demo of the game was available at the World Hobby Fair Winter 2016.

Yo-kai Watch Dance: Just Dance Special Version was released on December 5, 2015. The game was bundled with a Yo-kai Medal of Sergeant Burly. A bundle with a white Wii Remote Plus was also released.

Soundtrack 
The game featured a total of 10 songs, all of which originated from the Yo-kai Watch franchise.

Reception 

Famitsu gave the game a score of 28/40, with each reviewer giving it a 7. Chris Carter, writing for Destructoid, described the game as "[mixing] the wonderful art of Yo-kai with the garish 'humans' from Just Dance".

Notes

References

External links 
 

Crossover video games
Level-5 (company) games
Wii U-only games
2015 video games
Japan-exclusive video games
Ubisoft games
Wii U games
Dance video games
Music video games
Yo-kai Watch video games
Just Dance (video game series)
Video games developed in France
Video games developed in Japan